Blitar is a landlocked city in East Java, Indonesia, about 73 km from Malang and 167 km from Surabaya. The area lies within longitude 111° 40' – 112° 09' East and its latitude is 8° 06' South. The city of Blitar lies at an altitude on average 167 metres above sea level, and is an enclave within Blitar Regency which surrounds the city on all sides.

The city is noted as the location of the grave of Sukarno, the first president of Indonesia, five kilometers from the city plaza.  The Istana Gebang (Gebang palace) where Sukarno lived as a child is nearby and has been converted into a museum. containing numerous items commemorating Sukarno's place in Indonesian history.  In addition, the very active Kelud volcano is located just over 20 kilometers north of Blitar.

Administrative districts
Blitar city is divided into three districts (kecamatan), tabulated below with their areas and population totals from the 2010 census and the 2020 census, together with the official estimates as at mid 2021.

Local economic governance
Based on the survey conducted between August 2010 and January 2011, Blitar was rated number one in Indonesia for local economic governance, being considered particularly good in infrastructure, the interaction between local administrations and businesses, business licensing, and regional head capacity and integrity.

Sukarno's Mausoleum

It is located at Bendogerit village, Sunan wetan district, about 2 kilometers from Blitar city.

The tomb is built in East Javanese "Joglo" architectural pattern, and combined with Gateway of Bentar. 
The mausoleum is 51 feet high, with a copper roof of a three-tier building. Underneath, Sukarno's plot is flanked by that of his mother and father. A stone of black andesite bears the inscription, "Here lies Bung Karno, proclaimer of independence, first president of Indonesia."
Beside the main building of the tomb, the graveyard complex has Gapura Agung (The Great Gate), Mosque, halls, parks, a rest-area, and a parking place.

The tomb is opened to the public, attracts a large number of visitors, both domestic and international. About 1.5 million people visit the tomb annually.

People from Blitar

 Boediono -Former vice president of Indonesia.
 Admiral Agus Suhartono – Former commander-in-chief of the Indonesian military.
 Livi Zheng, film producer and director 
 Sien Kiem Lay, basketball coach, national player
 Soeryo Guritno, businessman
 Charis Yulianto, footballer
 Nitya Krishinda Maheswari, badminton athlete
 Wiweko Soepono, inventor and director/pilot of Garuda Indonesia
 Anjasmara, actor
 Anthony Fokker, aviation pioneer
 Sukadji Ranuwihardjo, academic
 Anas Urbaningrum, politician
 Imam Munandar, politician
 Masjchun Sofwan, politician
 Sukarni, politician
 Agus Suhartono, military leader
 Hengky Kurniawan, actor
 Putri Raemawasti, beauty queen, Puteri Indonesia 2007
 Hardi, painter

Climate
Blitar has a tropical monsoon climate (Am) with moderate to little rainfall from June to October and heavy rainfall from November to May.

See also
1945 PETA Revolt in Blitar

References

Further reading

External links

 Official site of Blitar City
 Official site of Blitar Regency
Heraldry of Blitar

 
Sukarno
1906 establishments in the Dutch East Indies
Enclaves and exclaves